Vaalai kai sambal, also known as vazhakkai sambal, ash plantain sambal, or green banana fry sambal, is a traditional Sri Lankan condiment. 'Vaalai kai' means unripe plantain in Tamil.

Vaalai kai sambal is a sambal made of plantain, thick coconut milk, onion, green chilies, red chilies, mustard seeds, vinegar, salt and lime juice. Dry roasted red chilies, mustard seeds, vinegar, salt and sugar are ground to form a smooth paste. Green chilies and onions are chopped into fine pieces. The plantains are peeled and diced before being mixed with tumeric powder and salt. The diced plantains are deep fried in oil until they turn to light brown colour. The plantains, green chilies, onions, coconut milk and paste are then mixed together before serving.

See also 
 Sambal
 Cuisine of Sri Lanka
 List of banana dishes

References 

Sri Lankan condiments
Sri Lankan cuisine
Plantain dishes